VFP-306 was a Light Photographic Squadron of the United States Navy Reserve established on 1 June 1970. The squadron was disestablished on 30 September 1984.

Operational history
.

Home port assignments
NAF Washington

Aircraft assignment
RF-8G Crusader

See also
 Reconnaissance aircraft
 List of inactive United States Navy aircraft squadrons
 History of the United States Navy

References

External links

Fleet air reconnaissance squadrons of the United States Navy